The Baltic Pipeline System-2 (BPS-2) is a second trunk line of the Baltic Pipeline System. The pipeline is constructed and operated by Russian oil pipeline company Transneft.  The BPS-2 was completed in 2011 and began to function in late March 2012.

History 
The project was proposed after an oil transit dispute between Russia and Belarus at the beginning of January 2007, and was approved by the Russian government on 21 May 2007.

Although in April 2008 Russia's Ministry of Industry and Energy submitted a negative profitability report regarding the pipeline, Russia opted to develop its own infrastructure for exporting hydrocarbons, bypassing former Soviet transit countries. The main
goal of the pipeline is to protect Russia and its partners from the transit countries' possible decisions to raise tariffs or siphon off hydrocarbons.  On 1 December 2008 Prime Minister Vladimir Putin signed a resolution ordering construction.

The construction started on 10 June 2009.  Construction was completed in October 2011. The opening of export terminal at Ust-Luga was postponed until 2012 due to damage by landslips.

Route
The pipeline passes Bryansk, Smolensk, Tver, Novgorod, and Leningrad regions.

Technical description

The initial capacity of the pipeline at the first stage is 10 million tons of oil per year, which will be upgraded to 50 million tons during the second stage. Of this, 12 million tons will be transported to Ust-Luga and 12 million tons to Kirishi refinery.

The construction cost is estimated at US$4 billion.  The second stage is expected to be completed by December 2013.

The pipeline will have eight pumping stations. During the first stage, two new pumping stations were built, and two pumping stations (in Unecha and Andreapol) were renovated. In addition, the oil terminal in Ust-Luga was built.

References

External links 

Official website (in Russian)

Energy infrastructure completed in 2011
Oil pipelines in Russia
Transneft
Baltic Sea